Tell Me Sweet Something is a 2015 South African romantic comedy film starring Nomzamo Mbatha, Maps Maponyane and Thishiwe Ziqubu. The film was directed by Akin Omotoso and produced by Robbie Thorpe. The film received nine nominations at the 12th Africa Movie Academy Awards and won two including Achievement in Screenplay and Best Supporting Actress for Thishiwe Ziqubu.

Cast
 Nomzamo Mbatha as Moratiwa
 Maps Maponyane as Nat
 Thishiwe Ziqubu as Tashaka

 Thomas Gumede as Gordon
 Makhaola Ndebele as Electrician
 Thembi Seete as Lola
 Kagiso Lediga as Katlego
 Mandisa Bardill as Robyn

References

External links

2015 films
2015 romantic comedy films
South African romantic comedy films
Best Screenplay Africa Movie Academy Award winners
Films directed by Akin Omotoso